Dudleytown is an unincorporated community in Washington Township, Jackson County, Indiana.

History
Dudleytown was laid out in 1837 by James Dudley, and named for him. It was the third town plotted in Jackson County. Dudleytown was settled as a center for trade in the Washington Township area. It was then located on a heavily traveled thoroughfare between Louisville and Indianapolis. At one time, the area housed two parochial schools and one public school. It currently has two Lutheran churches, one of which has a school. The township is split between two school districts: Seymour and Brownstown. Those who live in the actual town of Dudleytown go to Seymour. The population within the Dudleytown limits is roughly 25. The town is located on the intersection of State Highways 250 and 11.

According to an interview with Rolling Stone, Dudleytown was one of the inspirations for the John Mellencamp song "Rain on the Scarecrow."

Geography

References

Unincorporated communities in Jackson County, Indiana
Unincorporated communities in Indiana